Duplicaria helenae is a species of sea snail in the family Terebridae.

Description

Distribution

References

External links

Terebridae
Gastropods described in 1844